Miroslav Michalek (born 30 June 1965) is a Slovak ice hockey player. He competed in the men's tournament at the 1994 Winter Olympics.

References

1965 births
Living people
Olympic ice hockey players of Slovakia
Ice hockey players at the 1994 Winter Olympics
Sportspeople from Zvolen
Slovak ice hockey goaltenders
Czechoslovak ice hockey goaltenders
Slovak expatriate ice hockey players in Germany
Slovak expatriate ice hockey players in the Czech Republic